Terror 2000 is a Swedish thrash metal band from Helsingborg.

History 
A side project of Soilwork singer Björn "Speed" Strid, the band also includes guitarists Klas Ideberg (of Darkane) and Nick Sword (of Von Benzo), drummer Erik Thyselius, and bassist Dan Svensson. The band was initially formed under the name "Killing Machine" in 1999, and its original drummer was Henry Ranta of Soilwork, but he was replaced after the release of Slaughterhouse Supremacy.

Critical reception 
In a review of the band's album Terror for Sale, Decibel Magazine described the band's sound as "joke-rock" and stated that the album is "fun and rockin', but way too fun to really be all that rockin. AllMusic was also critical, awarding the album two-and-a-half stars out of five and expressing disappointment that the band's "indistinctive neo-thrash songwriting" did not live up to the promise of its lyrics and energy.

Band members 
Current members
 Björn "Speed" Strid − vocals (Soilwork, ex-Darkane, Disarmonia Mundi, Coldseed)
 Klas Ideberg − guitars (The Defaced, Darkane, Hyste'riah, Hyste'riah G.B.C.)
 Nick Sword (Niklas Svärd) − guitars
 Erik Thyselius − drums (ex-Construcdead, ex-Face Down, Arize)
 Dan Svensson − bass (Hatelight)

Former members
 Henry Ranta − drums on Slaughterhouse Supremacy (ex-Soilwork, ex-The Defaced)

Guest musicians
 Von Benzo singer Jay Smith sang backup in one song from Terror for Sale: "King Kong Song".

Discography 
 Slaughterhouse Supremacy (2000) − Pavement Music
 Faster Disaster (2002) − Nuclear Blast
 Slaughter in Japan-Live 2003 (2003) − Scarlet Records
 Terror for Sale (2005) − Nuclear Blast

References

External links 
 Terror 2000 official website
 [ Terror 2000] at AllMusic
 Terror 2000 at Encyclopaedia Metallum

Swedish thrash metal musical groups
Swedish melodic death metal musical groups
Musical groups established in 1999
Nuclear Blast artists
Musical groups from Helsingborg
Scarlet Records artists
1999 establishments in Sweden